The Iceland national cricket team represents the country of Iceland in international cricket. They are not members of the International Cricket Council (ICC), but played their first unofficial international match in 2018.

History
Formed in 2008, the team is administered by the Icelandic Cricket Association (Krikketsamband Íslands). An Icelandic team competed at the 2016 Pepsi Cup tournament in Prague, finishing fifth out of six teams.

They played their first, unofficial, international matches in July 2018 during a tour to England, when they faced Switzerland at Weybridge in Surrey. The costs of the tour were met through crowdfunding by members of the r/Cricket forum on Reddit, who became the team's official sponsors in the period 2018 to 2020. They won their first international match, a fifty-over game against Switzerland, by 215 runs.

Icelandic cricket lacks official recognition, but they plan to gain European Cricket Council membership in the future and subsequent affiliate membership of the International Cricket Council.

See also
Cricket in Iceland

References

Cricket
Cricket in Iceland
National cricket teams
Iceland in international cricket